Where Do You Go When You Dream is the sixteenth studio album by Canadian country pop artist Anne Murray, released in 1981 via Capitol Records. It reached #4 on the U.S. country album charts, and #55 on the pop album charts. In her native Canada, it reached #7 on the album chart. It was quickly certified Gold by the RIAA.

The album's first single, "Blessed Are the Believers", was Murray's sixth #1 Country hit. It also reached #10 on the Billboard Adult Contemporary chart, and #34 on the Billboard Hot 100.  "We Don't Have to Hold Out", "Another Sleepless Night" and "It's All I Can Do" were also released as follow-up singles. In the UK the first single was 'Where Do You Go When You Dream" (CL 16192).

Track listing

Personnel 
 Anne Murray – lead and backing vocals 
 Brian Gatto – keyboards (1, 2, 3, 5-8), synthesizers (9, 10)
 Doug Riley – keyboards (1, 5, 6, 8)
 Pat Riccio, Jr. – keyboards (2, 3, 7, 10), acoustic piano (9)
 Mike "Pepe" Frances – guitars (1, 6)
 Bob Mann – guitars (1, 5, 6, 8, 9), electric guitar solo (7)
 Brian Russell – guitars (1, 2, 3, 5-8)
 Aidan Mason – guitars (2, 3, 7, 9, 10)
 Sonny Garrish – steel guitar (2, 3)
 JayDee Maness – steel guitar (3, 5, 8)
 Georges Hébert – guitars (4, 7)
 Peter Cardinali – bass (1, 2, 3, 5-10), string arrangements and conductor  (2, 3, 7)
 Barry Keane – drums (1, 5, 6, 8)
 Jørn Andersen – drums (2, 3, 7, 9, 10)
 Victor Feldman – percussion (6, 8, 9, 10)
 Gerry Niewood – saxophone solo (9)
 Rick Wilkins – string arrangements and conductor (1, 5, 6, 8)
 Bruce Murray – backing vocals 
 Deborah Schaal Greimann – backing vocals
 Balmur Ltd. – executive producer, management
 Jim Ed Norman – producer 
 Ken Friesen – engineer 
 Graham Duff – assistant engineer 
 Fraser Hill – assistant engineer 
 Ken Perry – mastering at Capitol Mastering (Hollywood, California)
 Paul Cade – art direction, design 
 Bob Karman – illustration 
 Bill Langstroth – photography 
 Gord Marci – photography
 Hunter Brown Ltd. – typesetting
 Leonard T. Rambeau – management

Chart performance

References

1981 albums
Anne Murray albums
Capitol Records albums
Albums produced by Jim Ed Norman